Eugene Randolph Hodges, styled as Gene Hodges, (November 23, 1936 – July 6, 2014) was an American politician.

Born in Cedar Key, Florida, Hodges served in the United States Air Force 1955 to 1958. He served in the Florida House of Representatives as a Democrat from the 14th district from November 7, 1972, and the 11th district from November 7, 1982, to November 8, 1988. Hodges also served on the Cedar Key City Council. His father W. Randolph Hodges served in the Florida State Senate and his niece Dana Young also served in the Florida House of Representatives. He died in 2014 of a heart attack in Cedar Key, Florida.

Notes

1936 births
2014 deaths
People from Levy County, Florida
Military personnel from Florida
Florida city council members
Democratic Party members of the Florida House of Representatives